Kimberly Po-Messerli and Nicole Pratt were the defending champions. They were both present but did not compete together.
Po-Messerli partnered with Corina Morariu, but lost in the quarterfinals to Virginia Ruano Pascual and Paola Suárez.
Pratt partnered with Alicia Molik, but withdrew before their second round match against Elena Dementieva and Janette Husárová.

Virginia Ruano Pascual and Paola Suárez won in the final 6–4, 7–6(4), against Rika Fujiwara and Ai Sugiyama.

Seeds
The top four seeds received a bye into the second round.

Draw

Finals

Top half

Bottom half

External links
Draw and Qualifying Draw

Rogers ATandT Cup
2002 Canada Masters and the Rogers AT&T Cup